Adilabad Assembly constituency is a constituency of Telangana Legislative Assembly, India. It is one of the two constituencies in Adilabad district, Telangana. It comes under Adilabad Lok Sabha constituency along with 6 other Assembly constituencies.

Jogu Ramanna is representing the constituency for the fourth consecutive time.

Mandals
The Assembly Constituency presently comprises the following Mandals:

Election Data

Election results

Telangana Legislative Assembly election, 2018

Telangana Legislative Assembly election, 2014

See also
 List of constituencies of Telangana Legislative Assembly

References

Assembly constituencies of Telangana
Adilabad district